Events from the year 1895 in the United States.

Incumbents

Federal Government 
 President: Grover Cleveland (D-New York)
 Vice President: Adlai E. Stevenson I (D-Illinois)
 Chief Justice: Melville Fuller (Illinois)
 Speaker of the House of Representatives: Charles Frederick Crisp (D-Georgia) (until March 4), Thomas Brackett Reed (R-Maine) (starting December 2)
 Congress: 53rd (until March 4), 54th (starting March 4)

Events
February 9 – Mintonette, later known as volleyball, is created by William G. Morgan at Holyoke, Massachusetts.
March 1 – William Lyne Wilson is appointed United States Postmaster General.
May 27 – In re Debs: The Supreme Court of the United States decides that the federal government has the right to regulate interstate commerce, legalizing the military suppression of the Pullman Strike.
June 28 – The United States Court of Private Land Claims rules that James Reavis's claim to Barony of Arizona is "wholly fictitious and fraudulent".
July 4 – Katharine Lee Bates' lyrics for "America the Beautiful" are first published.
July 6 – Van Cortlandt Golf Course opens in The Bronx as the country's first and oldest public golf course.
August 19 – American frontier murderer and outlaw John Wesley Hardin is killed by an off-duty policeman in a saloon in El Paso, Texas.
September 3 – The first professional American football game is played, in Latrobe, Pennsylvania, between the Latrobe YMCA and the Jeannette Athletic Club (Latrobe wins 12–0).
September 18 – Booker T. Washington delivers the Atlanta Compromise speech.
November 5 – George B. Selden is granted the first U.S. patent for an automobile.
November 20 – USS Indiana, the first battleship in the United States Navy comparable to foreign battleships of this time, is commissioned.
November 25 – Oscar Hammerstein opens the Olympia Theatre, the first theatre to be built in New York City's Times Square district.
November 28 – Chicago Times-Herald race: The first American automobile race in history is sponsored by the Chicago Times-Herald. Press coverage first arouses significant U.S. interest in the automobile.
December 24 – George Washington Vanderbilt II officially opens his Biltmore Estate on Christmas Eve, inviting his family and guests to celebrate his new home in Asheville, North Carolina.

Undated
W. E. B. Du Bois becomes the first African American to receive a Ph.D. from Harvard University.
The gold reserve of the U.S. Treasury is saved when J. P. Morgan and the Rothschilds loan $65 million worth of gold to the United States government.
 Temple Cup: Cleveland Spiders defeat Baltimore Orioles, 4 games to 1

Ongoing
 Gilded Age (1869–c. 1896)
 Gay Nineties (1890–1899)
 Progressive Era (1890s–1920s)

Births
 January 1
 Bert Acosta, aviator (died 1954)
 J. Edgar Hoover, 1st Director of the Federal Bureau of Investigation (died 1972)
 January 4 – Leroy Grumman, aeronautical engineer, test pilot and industrialist (died 1982)
 January 11 – Laurens Hammond, inventor (died 1973)
 January 23 – Harry Darby, U.S. Senator from Kansas from 1949 to 1950 (died 1987)
 February 2 – George Halas, football player (died 1983)
 February 6 – Babe Ruth, baseball player (died 1948)
 March 4
 Milt Gross, comic book illustrator and animator (died 1953)
 Shemp Howard, actor and comedian (The Three Stooges) (died 1955)
 March 15 – Virgil Chapman, U.S. Senator from Kentucky from 1949 to 1951 (died 1951)
 March 27 – Ruth Snyder, murderer (electrocuted 1928)
 March 28 – Spencer W. Kimball, president of The Church of Jesus Christ of Latter-day Saints (died 1985)
 May 2 – Lorenz Hart, lyricist (died 1943)
 May 11 – William Grant Still, "the Dean" of African American composers (died 1978)
 May 15 – Prescott Bush, U.S. Senator from Connecticut from 1952 to 1963 (died 1972)
 May 25 – Dorothea Lange, documentary photographer and photojournalist (died 1965 in the United States)
 May 28 – Samuel D. Jackson, U.S. Senator from Indiana in 1944 (died 1951)
 June 10
 William C. Feazel, U.S. Senator from Louisiana in 1948 (died 1965)
 Hattie McDaniel, African American film actress (died 1952)
 June 24 – Jack Dempsey, heavyweight boxer (died 1983)
 July 12 – Richard Buckminster Fuller, architect (died 1983)
 July 13 – Bradley Kincaid, folk singer (died 1989)
 July 26 – Gracie Allen, comic actress (died 1964)
 August 12 – Lynde D. McCormick, admiral (died 1956)
 September 22 – Elmer Austin Benson, U.S. Senator from Minnesota from 1935 to 1936 and 24th Governor of Minnesota from 1937 to 1939 (died 1985)
 September 29 – Joseph Banks Rhine, parapsychologist (died 1980)
 October 4 – Buster Keaton, born Joseph Frank Keaton, silent film comedian (died 1966)
 October 6 – Caroline Gordon, writer and critic (died 1981)
 October 19 – Lewis Mumford, historian & philosopher of science (died 1990)
 October 23 – Clinton Presba Anderson, U.S. Senator from New Mexico from 1949 to 1973 (died 1975)
 October 30 – Dickinson W. Richards, physician, recipient of the Nobel Prize in Physiology or Medicine (died 1973)
 November 10 – John Knudsen Northrop, airplane manufacturer (died 1981)
 November 14 – Walter Freeman, neurologist (died 1972)
 November 29 – Busby Berkeley, film director and choreographer (died 1976)
 December 2 – W. Conway Pierce, chemist (died 1974)
 December 20 – Susanne Langer, philosopher (died 1985)
 December 24 – Marguerite Williams, African American geologist (died 1991)
 December 28 – Carol Ryrie Brink, author (died 1981)

Deaths
 January 9 – Aaron Lufkin Dennison, watchmaker (born 1812)
 February 20 – Frederick Douglass, African American rights activist and former slave (born 1817)
 March 22 – Henry Coppée, historian and biographer (born 1821)
 April 22 – James F. Wilson, U.S. Senator from Iowa from 1883 to 1895. (born 1828)
 May 28 – Walter Q. Gresham, politician (born 1832)
 June 23
 Thomas Shaw, buffalo soldier and Medal of Honor recipient (born 1846)
 James Renwick, Jr., architect (born 1818)
 June 29 – Green Clay Smith, politician (born 1826)
 July 28 – Edward Beecher, theologian (born 1803)
 August 1 – Hugh O'Brien, 31st Mayor of Boston, Massachusetts (born 1827)
 August 6 – George Frederick Root, composer (born 1820)
 August 22 – Luzon B. Morris, politician (born 1827)
 October 2 – Robert Crozier, U.S. Senator from Kansas from 1873 to 1874 (born 1827)
 October 6 – L. L. Langstroth, beekeeper (born 1810)
 October 8 – William Mahone, civil engineer and Confederate Army major general (born 1826)
 November 4 – Eugene Field, children's author (born 1850)
 Full date unknown – John Miley, Methodist theologian (born 1813)

See also
 List of American films of the 1890s
 Timeline of United States history (1860–1899)

References

External links
 

 
1890s in the United States
United States
United States
Years of the 19th century in the United States